Jatun Pinguilluni (possibly from Quechua hatun big, pinkillu a kind of flute, Aymara -ni a suffix to indicate ownership, "the one with a big pinkillu") is a mountain in the Carabaya mountain range in the Andes of Peru, about  high. It is located in the Puno Region, Carabaya Province, on the border of the districts Ajoyani and Coasa. Jatun Pinguilluni lies southeast of a lake named  Pampacocha.

References

Mountains of Peru
Mountains of Puno Region